Perfect Strangers is the eleventh studio album by the British rock band Deep Purple, released on 29 October 1984. It was the most successful album recorded by the re-formed 'Mark II' line-up.

It was the first Deep Purple studio album in nine years, and the first with the Mk II line-up in eleven years, the last being Who Do We Think We Are in 1973. Ritchie Blackmore and Roger Glover arrived from Rainbow, Ian Gillan from Black Sabbath, Jon Lord from Whitesnake, and Ian Paice from Gary Moore's backing band. Just one song in the reformed Deep Purple’s new repertoire, "Nobody’s Home",  would be credited to all five band members. Gillan and Glover attempted to return matters to the all-for-one composition credits of the Mk II lineup's 1970–73 recordings, but Blackmore held firm. It was not until Blackmore left the group in 1993 that the issue was finally resolved.

The CD and cassette versions of the album contained the extra track "Not Responsible" (which contains the lyric "I've got no ticket, but I'm gonna take a fucking ride", making it a rare example of profanity in a Deep Purple song). The album was remastered and reissued on 22 June 1999 with the bonus instrumental track "Son of Alerik". The latter had previously been available as a B-side on the single "Perfect Strangers" in 1984.

The album was a commercial success, reaching #5 in the UK charts and #17 on the Billboard 200 in the US. Perfect Strangers was only the second Deep Purple studio album to be certified platinum in the United States, following 1972's Machine Head. The tour was so successful that the band had to book many additional dates to the U.S. arena tour, as tickets sold out very quickly. Their U.S. tour in 1985 out-grossed every artist that year except Bruce Springsteen.

Reception

The album received mixed reviews. Deborah Frost of Rolling Stone in a contemporary review remarked that, with the exception of the two singles, "The material consists of hastily knocked-off jams" and wondered if the release was just made "to cash in on the current heavy-metal craze." But she also stated, "Blackmore's Strat has such a great roar that you're willing to just let it reverberate in your eardrums for a bit. And it's nice to hear Jon Lord's unsynthesized organ squalls, Ian Paice's electrifying drumming, Ian Gillan's howls and whispers and Roger Glover's solid bass lines once again," although, "Instead of Glover, an outside producer might have forced the band to tighten up its licks and arrangements."

Canadian journalist Martin Popoff praised this comeback album which "only nods to the '70s" and concentrates "on songcraft rather than technical display," placing Deep Purple as "a reference point of a genre in metal without categorization."

"A great moment in time," suggested Glover, "but, as an album, it doesn't quite hang together."

Track listing
All songs by Ritchie Blackmore, Ian Gillan and Roger Glover except where noted.

"Son of Alerik" had appeared in an edited form on the 7" B-side of the "Perfect Strangers" single, or in full on the 12" "Perfect Strangers" single and the European version of the compilation Knocking at Your Back Door: The Best of Deep Purple in the 80's.

Personnel
Deep Purple
 Ian Gillan – lead vocals
 Ritchie Blackmore – guitar
 Jon Lord – organ, keyboards
 Roger Glover – bass, synthesizer
 Ian Paice – drums

Production
 Produced by Roger Glover and Deep Purple
 Recorded at "Horizons", Stowe, Vermont with Le Mobile Studio, 1984
 Mixed at Tennessee Tonstudio, Hamburg, Germany
 Engineered by Nick Blagona
 Mastered by Greg Calbi at Sterling Sound, New York

Charts
 

Album 

Singles

Year-end charts

Certifications and sales

Accolades

References

Deep Purple albums
1984 albums
Albums produced by Roger Glover
Polydor Records albums
Mercury Records albums